Lonnie Marcus Randolph is a Democratic member of the Indiana Senate, representing the 2nd District since 2008. He earlier served from 1993 through 1998, leaving to become a judge for the East Chicago City Court.

Randolph is president of the Indiana Black Legislative Caucus.

References

External links 
 State Senator Lonnie M. Randolph official Indiana State Legislature site

 

Democratic Party Indiana state senators
1949 births
Living people
People from East Chicago, Indiana
Northern Illinois University alumni
African-American state legislators in Indiana
21st-century American politicians
21st-century African-American politicians
20th-century African-American people